Aktanysh (Aktanış; , Aqtanış), historically known as Lower Aktanyshbash (Tübänge Aqtanışbaş) or Aktanyshbash, is a rural locality (a selo) and the administrative center of Aktanyshsky District of the Republic of Tatarstan, Russia. The population is less than 10,000, though it has steadily increased in recent decades; 

History 
Aktanysh was settled by Bashkirs of the Yabalakovskaya tyuba of the Kyrgyz volost in the period prior to Bashkir integration into the Russian State. The earliest known record of the settlement dates from 1715.

Until 1920, the village was the center of Aktanyshsky Volost of the Menzelinsky Uyezd of Ufa Governorate. Aktanysh was included in the Tatar Autonomous Soviet Socialist Republic as part of the Menzelinsky canton. Since 1930 it has served as the center of the Aktanyshsky District, excepting the period during 1963 to 11 January 1965 when it was part of the Menzelinsky District. In the period from 1988 to 1991, Aktanysh had the status of an urban-type settlement.

Education 
The Boarding School of Humanities for Gifted Children is a gymnasium located in Aktanysh. Unlike other secondary schools in the Republic of Tatarstan, it is managed by the state rather than the municipal district and is directly subordinate to the Ministry of Education and Science of Tatarstan. The Aktanysh Technical College is also located within the locality.

References

Footnotes

Notes

Sources

External links 

 Aktanysh at Bashkirica.com 

Rural localities in Aktanyshsky District
Menzelinsky Uyezd